The Aerotec A-122 Uirapuru was a Brazilian military trainer aircraft. It was a low-wing monoplane with tricycle undercarriage that accommodated the pilot and instructor side-by-side. It first flew on 2 June 1965.

Design and development
In October 1967, the Brazilian Air Force ordered 30 aircraft to replace the obsolete Fokker S.11s and S.12s (T-21s and T-22s) that were operating in the Air Force Academy. Later, they ordered another 40, and then 30 more.  These were designated T-23.

The Bolivian Air Force ordered 36 examples in 1974, which flew until 1997, and in 1975 the Paraguayan Air Force bought eight aircraft to replace the Fokker T-21 (S.11). In 1986, six more were donated by the FAB. Most of them were withdrawn from service in 1992, replaced by the Enaer T-35 Pillán. As of 2009, only one T-23 is in flying conditions. Thirty others were sold in the civilian market.

A total of 155 were built including prototypes by the time production finished in 1977.

The T-23 suffered fatal accidents during spin training. The problem was solved after a crash in which an instructor described his stricken aircraft's responses to his control inputs all the way to the end.  Uirapurus then received a ventral fin under the rear fuselage to correct the issue.

In 1980 interest by the airforce in an improved version led to the development of the Uirapuru II, later known as the A-132 Tangará.

Variants
 A-122A Uirapuru – T-23 – Military trainer
 A-122B Uirapuru – Civil version
 A-122C Uirapuru – T-23C 
 A-132 Uirapuru II – enlarged version with improved canopy and larger vertical tail surfaces.

Operators

 Bolivian Air Force – 18 A-122A purchased in 1974.

 Brazilian Air Force

 Paraguayan Air Force  –  14 aircraft (8 in 1975 and 6 in 1986)
 Escuela Nacional de Aeronáutica Civil  –  1 aircraft (early 70s)

Specifications (T-23)

See also

References

Notes

Bibliography

 
 

Single-engined tractor aircraft
Low-wing aircraft
1960s Brazilian military trainer aircraft
1960s Brazilian civil trainer aircraft
Uirapuru
Aircraft first flown in 1965